Igor Paim Sganderla (born 5 November 1997) is a Brazilian footballer who plays as a midfielder for Gama.

References

External links
Profile at FOX Sports
Igor Paim at ZeroZero

1997 births
Living people
Brazilian footballers
Brazilian expatriate footballers
Figueirense FC players
Rampla Juniors players
FC Cartagena footballers
CE Operário Várzea-Grandense players
Sociedade Esportiva do Gama players
Uruguayan Primera División players
Segunda División B players
Association football midfielders
Expatriate footballers in Uruguay
Expatriate footballers in Spain
Brazilian expatriate sportspeople in Uruguay
Brazilian expatriate sportspeople in Spain